Speyeria carolae, or Carole's fritillary, is a butterfly in the family Nymphalidae (brush-footed butterflies). It was described by Cyril Franklin dos Passos and Lionel Paul Grey in 1942 and is found in North America, where it has only been recorded from the Charleston Mountains of Clark County, Nevada. The habitat consists of mountain slopes, foothills and forest openings.

The wingspan is 69–86 mm. The upperside of the wings is bright orange with black markings. The underside of the hindwings features inwardly triangular silver spots in a marginal row, as well as a red-brown to buffy brown basal disk. Adults are on wing from mid-June to September in one generation per year.

The larvae feed on the leaves of Viola charlestonensis.

The MONA or Hodges number for Speyeria carolae is 4456.1.

References

Further reading
 Arnett, Ross H. (2000). American Insects: A Handbook of the Insects of America North of Mexico. CRC Press.
 Pelham, Jonathan P. (2008). "A catalogue of the butterflies of the United States and Canada with a complete bibliography of the descriptive and systematic literature". Journal of Research on the Lepidoptera, vol. 40, xiv + 658.

External links
Butterflies and Moths of North America
NCBI Taxonomy Browser, Speyeria carolae

Speyeria
Butterflies described in 1942